Batyieva Hora is a former village, and now  a historical neighbourhood in the Solomianskyi District of Kyiv, the capital of Ukraine. It is located on the right bank of the Dnieper, on the side of the hill above the river Lybid. Burial grounds of Zarubintsy culture dated in the 2nd-4th century AD were discovered in Batyieva Hora.

The neighbourhood was first mapped on Kyiv city maps as "Batyievi graves". The village was founded and the end of the 19th or beginning of the 20th century and was populated by railroad workers. Kuchmyn Yar Street is here.

References

Neighborhoods in Kyiv
Hills of Kyiv
Solomianskyi District